Jesse James Keitel is an American actress, writer, and artist, known for starring in Asher Jelinsky's award-winning short film Miller & Son (2019), the ABC crime drama Big Sky (2020) and on Queer as Folk (2022).

Early life 
Jesse James Keitel is from Long Island. She graduated from Pace University with a BFA in Acting in 2015.

Career
In 2019, Keitel starred in the world premiere of Martin Moran's play Theo at Two River Theater. She also starred in Miller & Son (2019), which won the BAFTA Student Film Award and Gold Medal for "Best Narrative" (Domestic) at the 2019 Student Academy Awards. Keitel played the leading role in the 2020 MadRiver Pictures sci-fi series, Forever Alone. Keitel also appeared in Linda Yellen's 2019 Showtime feature film Fluidity, starring Nico Tortorella. In 2022, Keitel debuted the role of Ruthie in Peacock's Queer As Folk.

Keitel has performed in drag under the pseudonym Peroxide, a member of the House of Femanon. As Peroxide Femanon, she has appeared in Logo TV's Fill In The Blank docuseries and in Sasha Velour's NYFW SS19 collaboration with Opening Ceremony.

Beginning in 2020, Keitel starred as Jerrie Kennedy in the David E. Kelley-created crime thriller Big Sky, which made her one of the first non-binary actors to play a non-binary series regular on primetime television. In 2022, she appeared in an episode of Star Trek: Strange New Worlds, playing a non-binary villain. In an interview, she said of the role: "I understand that queer people have had a really long and complicated history with TV and film, and they’ve been very mistreated in the media....That being said, I think it’s high time we let queer people be villains, you know?"

Awards and accolades
Keitel was honored in Out magazine's OUT100 in 2018 for her portrayal of queer characters in the Ben Stiller-produced Netflix film Alex Strangelove, as well as playing TV Land's first non-binary character on Younger.

Personal life
In 2020, Keitel was described as a non-binary and transgender actor "who uses she/her and they/them pronouns". As of 2022, she identifies as a transgender woman and uses she/her pronouns.

Filmography

References

External links 
 

Living people
Year of birth missing (living people)
People from Long Island
Pace University alumni
21st-century American actresses
Transgender actresses
Transgender artists
Transgender drag performers
Transgender writers